Pherocera flavipes is a species of stiletto flies (insects in the family Therevidae).

References

Therevidae
Articles created by Qbugbot
Insects described in 1923